Manuel Verdugo Mendoza (June 15, 1922 – December 12, 2001) was a United States Army master sergeant who distinguished himself in World War II fighting the Germans in Italy. Nearly 70 years later and 12 years after his death, he was posthumously awarded the Medal of Honor.

Military service
Mendoza, who was of Mexican American descent, joined the Army from Phoenix, Arizona, in November 1942 and served in World War II, during which his actions in Italy earned him the Medal of Honor.  He later served in the Korean War as a master sergeant and was wounded in battle. He was honorably discharged and left the Army in 1953.

Medal of Honor action and citation
Mendoza is credited with single-handedly breaking up a German counterattack on October 4, 1944, at Mt. Battaglia, Italy. He was originally awarded the Distinguished Service Cross for his bravery.

Nearly 70 years would pass before his heroism was properly recognized with the Medal of Honor. That belated recognition came through the Defense Authorization Act, which called for a review of Jewish American and Hispanic American veterans from World War II, the Korean War and the Vietnam War who had been awarded the Distinguished Service Cross to see if they had been denied the Medal of Honor by prejudice.
Mendoza was awarded the Medal of Honor by President Barack Obama in a March 18, 2014, ceremony in the White House. As Mendoza had died in 2001, his widow accepted his award.

His citation reads:

Honors and awards
Mendoza awards include:

Civilian life and death
Mendoza, worked as a foreman at the Palo Verde Nuclear Generation Station until he retired because of ill health. He died December 12, 2001, aged 79, and is buried in the Mountain View Funeral Home and Cemetery in Mesa, Arizona.

See also

 List of Hispanic Medal of Honor recipients
 List of Medal of Honor recipients
 List of Medal of Honor recipients for World War II
 Hispanic Medal of Honor recipients
 Hispanic Americans in World War II

References

1922 births
2001 deaths
World War II recipients of the Medal of Honor
United States Army Medal of Honor recipients
Recipients of the Distinguished Service Cross (United States)
United States Army soldiers
United States Army personnel of World War II
United States Army personnel of the Korean War
American people of Mexican descent